The Accademia Nazionale di Santa Cecilia is one of the oldest musical institutions in the world, founded by the papal bull Ratione congruit, issued by Sixtus V in 1585, which invoked  two saints prominent in Western musical history: Gregory the Great, for whom the Gregorian chant is named, and Saint Cecilia, the patron saint of music. Since 2005 it has been headquartered at the Renzo Piano designed Parco della Musica in Rome.

It was founded as a "congregation", or "confraternity", and over the centuries has grown from a forum for local musicians and composers to an internationally acclaimed academy active in music scholarship (with 100 prominent music scholars forming the body of the Accademia), music education (in its role as a conservatory) and performance (with an active choir and a symphony orchestra, the Orchestra dell'Accademia Nazionale di Santa Cecilia). The category of alumni of the associated conservatory (which in 1919 succeeded a liceo) includes many noted composers and performers.

History
The first seat of the Congregation from 1585–1622 was the church of Santa Maria ad Martires, better known as the Pantheon. Successive relocations were to the church of San Paolino alla Colonna (1622–52), Santa Cecilia in Trastevere (1652–61),  San Nicola dei Cesarini (1661–1663), Chiesa della Maddalena (1663–85), and, finally, San Carlo ai Catinari in 1685.

During the first century of existence, the Congregation was the workshop of a number of prominent musicians and composers of the day, including Giovanni Pierluigi da Palestrina. The institution in that period was often in rivalry with the  other important musical organization of Papal Rome of the day, the Sistine Choir. Rivalry centred on the rights to control access to the musical profession, to train musicians, and to publish music. The rivalry never really ended and can be said to have lasted through the entire existence of the Papal States, that is, until 1870, when the  "temporal power of the Church" was ended by military action of the new nation state of Italy.

The early 18th century is considered to have been a particularly glorious time for the Accademia. Among names associated with the organization during that period are Arcangelo Corelli, Alessandro and Domenico Scarlatti, and Niccolò Jommelli. In 1716, Pope Clement XI decreed that all musicians practising their profession in Rome were required to become members of the Congregation. The Accademia suspended operations during the revolutionary period of the Napoleonic Wars but opened regularly again in 1822 a few years after the Restoration brought about by the Congress of Vienna.

The years between that reopening and the end of the Papal States in 1870 were ones of great change. The organization opened its membership to hitherto excluded categories, such as dancers, poets, music historians, musical instrument makers, and music publishers. In 1838, the Congregation of Santa Cecilia was officially proclaimed an Academy and then a Papal Academy. The list of active and honorary members of the Accademia during that period is formidable and includes Cherubini, Mercadante, Donizetti,  Rossini, Paganini, Auber, Liszt, Mendelssohn, Berlioz, Gounod, and Meyerbeer. Among the crowned heads of Europe who were honorary members was Queen Victoria.

After the unification of Italy, the Accademia reestablished itself with the formation of a permanent symphony orchestra and choir, beginning in 1895. It went from being the seat of a Liceo musicale—a music "high school"—to being a full-blown conservatory; also, it hosts the "Eleonora Duse" Drama School, as well as a centre for experimental cinema. The most recent innovation has been the digitisation and cataloguing of centuries of musical documents—including an important collection of traditional music in the ethnomusicological archives—and their preservation and eventual display in the Accademia's multimedia library and archive also available to the public online. The Accademia also maintains a musical instruments museum (the MUSA).

Alumni 

Gaqo Çako
Alfredo Costa
Franco Donatoni
Ferenc Farkas
Jorgjia Filçe-Truja
Beniamino Gigli
Aristodemo Giorgini
Aurelio Giorni
Gaetano Giuffrè
Preng Jakova
Ramiz Kovaçi
Sylvia Kersenbaum
Hersi Matmuja
Anna Moffo
Lúcia Moniz
Bruno Nicolai
Piero Niro
Carlo Peroni
Zoltán Peskó
Franco Piersanti
Sergei Rachmaninoff
Diogenes Rivas
Sonya Scarlet
Victor Togni
Tessie Mobley

References

External links

 Official website

 
Music schools in Italy
1585 establishments in Italy
Education in Rome
Learned societies of Italy
Educational institutions established in the 1580s